Manaf Al-Saeed (born 19 May 1976) is a former Saudi Arabian handball player for Al-Noor and the Saudi Arabian national team. Al-Saeed retired in 2015.

He participated at the 2017 World Men's Handball Championship.

References

1976 births
Living people
Saudi Arabian male handball players
Handball players at the 2006 Asian Games
Asian Games competitors for Saudi Arabia
21st-century Saudi Arabian people
20th-century Saudi Arabian people